Io canto  (English: "I Sing") is the ninth studio album by Italian singer Laura Pausini, released by Warner Music on 10 November 2006. On 14 November, Warner Music released Io cantos Spanish-language edition Yo canto for the hispanophone market. Yo canto–Io canto is a limited-edition double album featuring both the Italian– and Spanish-language editions. This marks the first instance in Pausini's multilingual music career in which both editions are offered in a single release. Warner Music issued a third edition pressed exclusively for the French market. This pressing of Io canto features the bonus track "Je chante", a partial French adaptation of the Italian "Io canto".

The album consists entirely of covers. Its repertoire spans three decades of Italian pop music history. Pausini pays homage to fellow Italian singer–songwriters whose lyrical work have influenced her artistic sensibility throughout the years. In the album's liner notes Pausini reveals:

Yo canto features "Dispárame, dispara", also known as "Corazón roto"—opening theme of the Mexican telenovela Amar sin límites (2006). Chile's Canal 13 employed the album's title track for its television series Cantando por un sueño. The album won the Latin Grammy in 2007 for Best Female Pop Vocal Album.

Inception
The decision to present a cover album stemmed from a "pending debt" to Pausini's musical roots and homeland. She first conceptualized the idea approximately ten years prior to Io cantos publication. The idea, however, did not take root until Pausini's golden year in 2006 that culminated in a Grammy Award for Best Latin Pop Album for Escucha (2004) at the 48th Annual Grammy Awards. At the post–Grammy press conference, journalists remarked how they admired Pausini for never having abandoned her brand of "Italian pop of always" despite her classification as a "Latin music" artist. Alluding to Pausini's "Italian–ness," Randy Cordova for The Arizona Republic concurred, "She doesn't pander to the crowd with Latin guitars, reggaeton remixes or Cuban percussion. [Her music] is all very organic." This acknowledgement moved Pausini to honor Italy by recording a cover album of Italian "classics". Pausini also wished to export underappreciated Italian music to the world as a consequence of her multilingualism furthermore the album has sold over 2.500.000 copies worldwide.

The song "Come il sole all'improvviso" and its Spanish counterpart version have lyrics in French language.

Track listing

Io canto

Yo canto

Personnel 
Vinnie Colaiuta: drums on tracks 1, 4, 5, 6, 10, 13, 15, 16
Michael Landau, Tim Pierce: guitars
Max Costa: programming

Chart performance 
The first single "Io canto" debuted at No. 3 on the Italian chart at the beginning of November, and it peaked at No. 1 in the week before Christmas. It has spent a total of 4 weeks at the top spot.
The album debuted at No. 1 in the Italian chart with 270,000 copies shipped in the first week. At the end of 2006 it became the Italian's best-selling album of the year, selling over 500,000 copies.
It has spent a total of 8 weeks at No. 1.
As of October 2008 the album sold over 3,000,000 copies worldwide.

Charts and certifications

Charts

Year-end charts

Sales and certifications

Tour
Pausini chose not to do a tour to promote Io canto. Instead, she opted for a single concert in Milan, in the Stadio San Siro, making history as the first female artist to play a gig in this venue. The sold out concert happened on 2 June 2007. Approximately 70,000 fans attended in the incessant rain. Tiziano Ferro appeared for a duet. The two and a half-hour concert has been released on DVD in December 2007.

Notes

References
Blanco, Patricia R. "Laura Pausini editará su nuevo álbum, 'Io canto,' en español e italiano", los40.com (Spain), 10 November 2006. Retrieved 9 October 2007.
Cordova, Randy. "Bellissima: Italian singer a favorite of Latinos", The Arizona Republic, 16 July 2006. Retrieved 22 September 2007.
Galicia, Arístides. "Laura Pausini es igual que su padre", los40.com (México), 13 October 2006. Retrieved 15 October 2007.
"Laura Pausini canta a los clásicos de la canción italiana", Terra (USA), 23 November 2006. Retrieved 21 September 2007.
"Laura Pausini dice que canta ", Terra (México), 17 October 2006. Retrieved 21 September 2007.
"Laura Pausini espera que en 'Cantando por un sueño' no se compita por la fama", Radio Cooperativa, 10 May 2007. Retrieved 21 September 2007.
"Laura Pausini Track by Track Interview". CONNECT Music. Retrieved 22 September 2007.

2006 albums
Laura Pausini albums
Latin Grammy Award for Best Female Pop Vocal Album
Covers albums